SLAM! (Sound Lifestyle And More, stylized as ►SLAM! and previously SLAM!FM) is a Dutch commercial national radio station that plays current-based rhythmic and dance hits. SLAM! has a strong commitment in breaking new dance music. The playlist and presentation serves as a combination of 538 and 3FM. The station is broadcast in the Netherlands and can be received via the either FM, Internet (worldwide) and cable. The broadcasting building and studios of SLAM! are located in Naarden, North Holland. In 2012, it was announced that SLAM! has the largest market share among the country's young people (16.8%). It is a sister station of 100% NL.

In 2016, SLAM! was reported to have a 0% market share for the 65-or-more age group. Carlo de Boer, SLAM!’s General Manager, then argued that SLAM! listeners were 30 years old in average, and that this market share “distinguished” SLAM! from other radio stations.

History

The radio station started in the mid 1990s as New Dance Radio, a cable radio station. At that time the station was received only through cable and the format consisted mainly of dance music (techno, trance, hardcore). Dutch entertainment company ID&T acquired the station in the late nineties, transforming it into Slam FM (named after one of ID&T's dance & lifestyle magazines at the time, Slam). Within a year, the name was changed into ID&T Radio, reflecting ID&T's strategy at the time to bundle all activities under one brand name, i.e. ID&T). At Koen van Tijn, Emile van Schaik and Lucas Degen. A year later the station got another new name, ID&T Radio, and Robin Albers was hired to lead the drive.

ID&T Radio successfully bid for a nationwide FM frequency in Spring 2003 and changed its format to a more mainstream Top 40 genre, at least in its daytime programming schedule, whether in alternative remixing to comply with the rules on their airwave frequency-plot were imposed. Afterwards ID&T was accused and partially successfully sued by some competitors to have failed to meet its license requirements (including a playlist maximum of 7.5% chart-oriented hits and a minimum of 50% hits not older than one year). Sold late 2005, Duncan Stutterheim (ID&T) 66% of the shares of the station Lex Harding and Ruud Hendriks. On 31 January 2005 the station was called back that it had a year earlier: SLAM!FM. The station was mainly focus on young people.

Thereafter was followed by several light format changes. Today there is no longer just dance and R&B, but also broadcast pop and rock.

In February 2005, the name was changed to SLAM!FM again (This time with an exclamation mark in its name and logo, and written in all capitals; no further connections with the heretofore mentioned lifestyle magazine which ID&T had discontinued in the meantime).
The music programming became even more commercially and mainstream focussed.

On 30 June 2005 ID&T sold its remaining 33% share in SLAM!FM to 2HM Media for EUR 2.5 Million, allegedly due to irreconcilable differences regarding managing the radio station and the effective price to be paid for the initial sale of the 67% share.

In October 2005, investment company 2H Media (led by former Veronica and Radio 538 director Lex Harding, broadcaster Ruud Hendriks, and Marcel Dijkhuizen) acquired 67% of SLAM!FM.

During the period between Christmas and New Year 2005 SLAM!FM broadcast SLAM!500, in where "the 500 best dance hits of Netherlands are broadcast".

In June 2006 Harding and Hendriks filed a lawsuit against Stutterheim, because they refused the remaining 33% of the SLAM! FM to buy shares for 2.5 million euros. They thought they had paid too much for the previous packet. The judge agreed.

On 1 February 2007 SLAM!TV is launched. SLAM!TV is television for and by young people. An interactive youth TV channel with 24 hours a day, 7 days a week the most popular music videos. In addition, viewers can upload their homemade videos, photos and audio files and make them available to friends and/or any other site visitors. Soon it will be possible to offer the films for broadcast on SLAM!TV.

On 20 March 2007 forbids the judge SLAM! any longer improperly with Radio 538 to compete by "re-edits" and remixes of tunes from the charts. SLAM!FM broadcasts namely on a stipulated frequency at which it is not allowed. Also counted the transmitter according to the right-hand unduly background music note when making calls as music, making it thought to be able to meet the requirement that the music must fulfill 95 percent of the airtime between 7am and 7pm. On appeal to the Tribunal herein 5 December 2007 and has ruled SLAM!FM received equal in "too much talk" but proved wrong in terms of "re-edits". However, the ruling does not affect the current music interpretation because SLAM! for some time now sends no longer own edits.

The former jingles were produced by ReelWorldEurope. That package is a jingle resing to that of the US radio station jingles WKTU in 2005. This, however, have been replaced by a custom package.

On 19 November 2008 it was announced that SLAM!FM was reorganizing, in part due to a decrease in ad spending during the financial crisis of 2007–2008. Shareholder 2HMedia no additional budget proposed unavailable, which SLAM!FM forced to deal effectively with staff. Of the average of 31.6 people who had full-time employment in 2007, only 20.4 remained after the reorganization. In total, 14 people left the station, including several Disc jockeys including Daniël Lippens and Timo Kamst. Several staff contracts were not renewed.

On 27 April 2011 it was announced that RTL Nederland the Zerobase Lot A05 has taken over. This acquisition was in effect by 1 June 2011. On 1 January 2012, Slam!FM in the hands of Talpa Holding as a result of the deal between Talpa and RTL Group. Since then, the station part of the 538 Groep.

In June 2011 SLAM!FM was bought by the 538 Groep (with his parent company RTL 2011-2012, Talpa 2012–present).

On 2 November 2013 Menno de Boer left SLAM!FM, and switched to the radio station 538. This led to adoption of the 'Most Wanted' DJ Martijn La Grouw.

On 6 January 2014 De Avondploeg moved to Radio 538. De Avondploeg takes on Radio 538's old timeslot Mark Labrand over. The old time slot on SLAM!FM would be taken over by Igmar Felicia on January 6 with the program "Bij Igmar". He presents this program along with Joep Schrijvers.

On 31 August 2015 the name of SLAM!FM changed to SLAM!

On 3 October 2016, it was announced that Talpa Media sold SLAM! and Slam!TV to Radiocorp.

Programming rules 
For SLAM! to get the broadcasting licence it must follow a set of guidelines for programming rules. Here're some in general, between 7am and 7pm:

 No more than 7.5% of the tunes played is/has been on the Netherlands' pop charts;
 95% of the airtime must have music played (excluding speech delivered by DJs);
 50% of the tunes must have been released within 12 months;
 No classical and jazz music is played;
 At least 50% of the programming must be presented in Dutch or Frisian.

In addition, there must be at least one news-related or -dedicated segment per hour, every hour between 7am and 11pm.

Current DJs

 Audiotricz
 Blasterjaxx
 Brennan Heart
 Digital Punk
 Dimitri Vegas & Like Mike
 DJ Jeff
 Eelke Kleijn
 Firebeatz
 Floris Tausent
 Franky Rizardo
 Gijs Alkemade
 Giorgio Hokstam
 GLOWINTHEDARK
 Jochem Hamerling
 Joep Schrijvers
 Joost Burger
 Mark Knight
 Martijn La Grouw
 MC Villain
 Michiel Jurrjens
 Nicole Moudaber
 Oliver Heldens
 Olivier Weiter
 The Partysquad
 R3hab
 Rens Goseling
 Robin Leféber
 Sam Divine
 Sander van Doorn
 Sanne van der Meijden
 Sunnery James & Ryan Marcinano
 W&W
 Yellow Claw

Former DJs
 Alex Oosterveen
 Armin van Buuren
 Bram Krikke
 Daniël Lippens
 Dave Leusink
 Dimitris Kops
 DJ Jean
 Dash Berlin
 Emile van Schaik
 Eric van Kleef
 Erwin van der Bliek
 Ferry Corsten
 Frank Dane
 Hardwell
 Headhunterz
 Koen van Tijn
 Kristel van Eijk
 Igmar Felicia
 Ivo van Breukelen
 Jeroen Post
 Jordi Warners
 Jurjen Gofers
 Lange Frans
 Lex Gaarthuis
 Lucas Degen
 Mark Labrand
 Maurice Verschuuren
 Menno de Boer
 Mental Theo
 Michael Blijleven
 Niels de Koning
 Nicky Romero
 Nicky Verhage
 Rob Toonen
 Robin Velderman
 Tamara Brinkman
 Timo Kamst
 Tom van der Weerd

Programs

See also

 List of radio stations in the Netherlands

References

External links

SLAM!FM.nl

Radio stations in the Netherlands
Radio stations established in 1996
Mass media in Hilversum
Music in Hilversum